Foreground and background or background and foreground may refer to:

Background, foreground, sideground and postground intellectual property, distinct forms of intellectual property assets
Background subtraction, a technique in image processing and computer vision by which an image's foreground is extracted for further processing
Figure–ground (perception), a humans' ability to separate foreground from background in visual images
Foreground-background, a scheduling algorithm that is used to control execution of multiple processes on a single processor
Foreground-background segmentation, a method for studying change blindness using photographs with distinct foreground and background scenery
Foreground detection, a concept in computer vision to detect changes in image sequences
Foreground and background in photography and cinematography, a principle important for
Depth of field, the distance between the nearest and farthest objects in a scene that appear acceptably sharp in an image
Deep focus, a technique using a large depth of field
Fill flash, to correctly expose the foreground and background objects
Photographic layering, a compositional technique
Front projection effect, an in-camera visual effects process in film production for combining foreground performance with pre-filmed background footage
Parallax scrolling, a scrolling technique in computer graphics, wherein background images move by the camera slower than foreground images, creating an illusion of depth
Rear projection effect, an in-camera cinematic technique in film production for combining foreground performances with pre-filmed backgrounds
Simple interactive object extraction, an algorithm used to extract foreground objects from color images and videos
Structural level, an abstract representation of a piece of music.

See also
Background (disambiguation)